Agonum nitidum is a species of ground beetle in the genus Agonum.

References

nitidum
Beetles described in 1844